SpryNet was formed as a dial-up Internet service provider by CompuServe on February 6, 1996.

Assets and customers were acquired by MindSpring in October 1998.

References

Defunct Internet service providers
CompuServe
Internet properties established in 1996
1998 mergers and acquisitions